Walkabout to Cornwall is a 1966 British feature documentary about Australian surfers in Cornwall, directed by Peter Sykes.

References

1966 films
1966 documentary films
British documentary films
Films directed by Peter Sykes
1960s British films